On the Basis of Sex is a 2018 American biographical legal drama film based on the life and early cases of Ruth Bader Ginsburg, who was the second woman to serve as an Associate Justice of the United States Supreme Court. Directed by Mimi Leder and written by Daniel Stiepleman (Ginsburg's real-life nephew), it stars Felicity Jones as Ginsburg. Armie Hammer, Justin Theroux, Jack Reynor, Cailee Spaeny, Sam Waterston, and Kathy Bates feature in supporting roles.

The film had its world premiere at the AFI Fest on November 8, 2018, and was theatrically released in the United States on December 25, 2018, by Focus Features. On the Basis of Sex received generally favorable reviews from critics, who praised Jones' performance, the film's intricacy and its pacing at a dramatic level. Other critics felt the biopic was predictable, over-packaged and hagiographic. Made on a $20 million budget, On the Basis of Sex grossed $38.8 million at the box office.

Plot 

In 1956, Ruth Bader Ginsburg is a first-year student at Harvard Law School, when  her husband Martin Ginsburg, a second-year student, is diagnosed with testicular cancer. She attends both her classes and his, taking notes and transcribing lectures while caring for Martin and their infant daughter Jane. Two years later, Martin's cancer is in remission and he is hired by a firm in New York City. Ruth petitions Harvard Law School Dean Griswold to allow her to complete her Harvard law degree with classes at Columbia Law School in New York, but he insists on following Harvard University policies at the time and denies her request, so she transfers to Columbia. In spite of graduating at the top of her class, she is unable to find a position with a law firm because none of the firms she applies to want to hire a woman. She takes a job as a professor at Rutgers Law School, teaching "Sex Discrimination and the Law".

In 1970, Martin brings Moritz v. Commissioner, a tax law case, to Ruth's attention. Charles Moritz is a man from Denver who had to hire a nurse to help him care for his aging mother so he could continue to work. Moritz was denied a tax deduction for the nursing care because at the time Section 214 of the Internal Revenue Code specifically limited the deduction to "a woman, a widower or divorcée, or a husband whose wife is incapacitated or institutionalized". The court ruled that Moritz, a man who had never married, did not qualify for the deduction. Ruth sees in this case an opportunity to begin to challenge the many laws enacted over the years that assume that men will work to provide for the family, and women will stay home and take care of the husband and children. She believes that if she could set a precedent ruling that a man was unfairly discriminated against on the basis of sex, that precedent could be cited in cases challenging laws that discriminate against womenand she believes that an appellate court composed entirely of male judges would find it easier to identify with a male appellant.

Ruth meets with Mel Wulf of the ACLU to try to enlist their help, but he turns her down. Ruth flies to Denver to meet with Moritz, who agrees to let the Ginsburgs and ACLU represent him pro bono after Ruth convinces him that millions of people could potentially benefit. After reading the draft of the brief, Dorothy Kenyon, who was cold to the idea at first, meets with Wulf in his office and convinces him to sign on. The Ginsburgs and Wulf file an appeal of Moritz's denial with the Tenth Circuit Court of Appeals. Department of Justice Attorney James H. Bozarth asks to be the lead counsel for the defense. Bozarth does a computer search to find all of the sections of the US Code that deal with sex. His defense will contend that, if section 214 is ruled unconstitutional, that will open the door to challenge all of America's sex-based laws. Ruth, having no courtroom experience, does poorly in a moot court, and Wulf convinces her to let Martin lead off arguing the tax law, with Ruth following up with equal protection arguments.

The government offers Moritz a settlement of one dollar. Ruth makes a counter-proposal: the government will pay Moritz the sum he claimed as a deduction and make a declaration that he did nothing wrong, and also enter into the record that the sex-based portion of section 214 is unconstitutional. The government declines this proposal because of the constitutionality element. During oral argument at the Court of Appeals, Martin takes more of their side's allotted time than he had intended. Ruth is nervous but makes several key points and reserves four minutes of her time for rebuttal. Bozarth frames his side's argument as defending the American way of life, implying that the Ginsburgs and ACLU want "radical social change" and maybe Moritz "just doesn't want to pay his taxes". In her rebuttal, Ruth is much more confident. She states that societal roles that existed one hundred years ago, or even twenty years ago, no longer apply. She does not ask the court to change society, but for the law to keep up with societal changes that have already taken place. To a judge's objection that the Constitution does not contain the word "woman", she responds vigorously that neither does it contain the word "freedom".

Outside the courthouse, judgment being reserved, Wulf, Moritz, and the Ginsburgs celebrate that, win or lose, Ruth has finally found her voice as a lawyer. Titles over the closing scene indicate that the Court of Appeals found unanimously in Moritz's favor. Ruth went on to co-found the Women's Rights Project at the ACLU, which struck down many of the sex-based laws Bozarth identified, and in 1993 the Senate voted 96 to 3 for her to become an associate justice of the United States Supreme Court. The final scene shows the real-life Ginsburg walking up the steps of the Supreme Court building.

Cast

Production 
Robert W. Cort produced the film through Participant Media. On July 18, 2017, Deadline reported that the film would be directed by Mimi Leder. Production started in late 2017 in Montreal Quebec, and the cast was rounded out by Justin Theroux, Kathy Bates, Sam Waterston, Jack Reynor, Stephen Root, and Cailee Spaeny in October as filming commenced.

Writing
The film's script, written by Daniel Stiepleman who is Ginsburg's nephew, had made the 2014 blacklist of the best unproduced screenplays of the year.

Casting
Natalie Portman had previously been linked to the role of Ginsburg. On July 18, 2017, Deadline reported that Jones would play the role of Ginsburg in the film. On September 7, 2017, Hammer was cast to play Ruth's husband Martin. The cast was completed by Justin Theroux, Kathy Bates, Sam Waterston, Jack Reynor, Stephen Root and Cailee Spaeny in October as filming commenced. In April 2018, it was announced that Ginsburg would appear in a small role.

Release 
The film was scheduled to be released by Focus Features on November 9, 2018, but was pushed back to a limited release on December 25, 2018, with a wide release on January 11, 2019. It had its world premiere at the AFI Fest on November 8, 2018.

Marketing
The first trailer for the film debuted on July 16, 2018. The trailer was criticized for a scene in which Ginsburg tells a judge that the word "freedom" does not appear in the United States Constitution; it appears in the First Amendment. Screenwriter Daniel Stiepleman, in response to the criticism, stated that the point of the dialogue was to show that the Constitution, like the country as a whole, was always open to improvement.

On September 21, 2018, pop rap recording artist Kesha released the song "Here Comes the Change" as a standalone single, however it was not included in the film's soundtrack.

Reception

Box office
On the Basis of Sex grossed $24.6 million in the United States and Canada, and $14.1 million in other territories, for a total worldwide gross of $38.7 million.

The film grossed a "solid" $442,000 from 33 theaters on its first day of release, December 25. It went on to gross $690,000 in its first weekend, a total of $1.5 million over its first six days. During January 11–13, its first weekend of wide release, the film made $6.2 million from 1,923 theaters, finishing sixth at the box office. In its second weekend of wide release, the film fell 35% to $4 million, finishing 10th.

Critical response
The website's critical consensus reads, "On the Basis of Sex is nowhere near as groundbreaking as its real-life subject, but her extraordinary life makes a solid case for itself as an inspirational, well-acted biopic." On Metacritic, the film has a weighted average score of 59 out of 100, based on 40 critics, indicating "mixed or average reviews". Audiences polled by CinemaScore gave the film an average grade of "A" on an A+ to F scale, while PostTrak reported filmgoers gave it an overall positive score of 94% and a "definite recommend" of 62%.

A. O. Scott of The New York Times noted that the film stays close to the true story of Ginsburg's emergence as a leading women's rights attorney: "That the movie may leave you wanting more — more history, more personality, more complicated emotion, more ideological contention — doesn't necessarily count against it. Historical narratives are best when they pique curiosity as well as satisfy it..."

See also 
 RBG (film), a biographical documentary focusing on the larger life and career of Ginsburg, also released in 2018.

References

External links 
 
 
Panel discussion with Felicity Jones, Mimi Leder, and Daniel Stiepleman, December 11, 2018, C-SPAN

2018 films
2010s legal drama films
American biographical drama films
American legal drama films
Drama films based on actual events
Films about sexism
American historical films
Participant (company) films
Focus Features films
Films directed by Mimi Leder
Films scored by Mychael Danna
Films shot in Montreal
Arts & Crafts Productions
2010s feminist films
2018 biographical drama films
Cultural depictions of judges
Cultural depictions of activists
Cultural depictions of American women
Ruth Bader Ginsburg
Cultural depictions of lawyers
Films about activists
Films set in the 1950s
Films set in the 1960s
Films set in the 1970s
2018 drama films
2010s English-language films
2010s American films